Worku Tesfamichael was the first Minister of Tourism of Eritrea. Worku guided the elevation of this former Department to Ministry status in hopes of attracting more tourists to Eritrea.

She was replaced as Minister of Tourism and instead appointed as Commissioner of Refugee Affairs in February 1997.

References

People's Front for Democracy and Justice politicians
Government ministers of Eritrea
Living people
Women government ministers of Eritrea
20th-century women politicians
Year of birth missing (living people)